Tikun Olam may refer to:

 Tikkun olam, a concept in Judaism
 Tikun Olam (blog)
 Tikun Olam (cannabis), medical marijuana firm in Israel